Walting may refer to:

Walting, Eichstätt, Germany
Walting, Kavrepalanchok, Nepal